Aspergillus aureoterreus is a species of fungus in the genus Aspergillus. It is from the Terrei section. The species was first described in 2011. It has been reported to produce citreoviridin.

References 

aureoterreus
Fungi described in 2011